Daggerpod is a common name for several plants and may refer to:

Anelsonia eurycarpa
Phoenicaulis cheiranthoides